Melanotaenia affinis, the North New Guinea rainbowfish, New Guinea rainbowfish, or red-finned rainbowfish, is a species of rainbowfish endemic to New Guinea (Western New Guinea and Papua New Guinea). It grows to  standard length. Of the three known varieties, the so-called standard variety has the widest range. It is commonly found in the Markham, Ramu, and Sepik Rivers; their preferred habitat includes clear rainforest streams, swamps, pools, and lagoons abundant in vegetation and submerged logs.

In the aquarium
The New Guinea rainbowfish is a peaceful and adaptable rainbowfish species that grows to 14 cm. It favors a pH of 7.0, hard water: (100–150 mg/L) and a temperature of 21–28 C (70 to 82 F). It will eat small live foods and prepared diets. Just like related species, it should be kept in shoals.

References

 Encyclopedia of Aquarium and Pond Fish (2005) (David Alderton)
 Anon. (2001). Fish collection database of the National Museum of Natural History (Smithsonian Institution). Smithsonian Institution - Division of Fishes.
 Allen, G.R. (1991). Field Guide to the Freshwater Fishes of New Guinea. Christensen Research Institute, Madang, Papua New Guinea.

External links
 Melanotaenia affinis
 Ryan Junghenn Aquarium Fish Experts

affinis
Endemic fauna of New Guinea
Freshwater fish of Papua New Guinea
Freshwater fish of Western New Guinea
Fishkeeping
Fish described in 1907
Taxa named by Max Carl Wilhelm Weber